Sept hommes et une garce is a French adventure film from 1967. It was directed by Bernard Borderie, written by Bernard Borderie and Mireille de Tissot, starring Jean Marais and Marilù Tolo. The film was known under the title Seven Guys and a Gal (USA),  (Italy),  (West Germany),  (Portugal), "7 Mann und ein Luder" (Austria).

Cast 
 Jean Marais: Dorgeval
 Marilù Tolo: Carlotta
 Sylvie Bréal: Monica
 Florin Piersic: Franguignon
 Ettore Manni: Austrian capitain
 Joëlle Bernard: the female sutler
 Joëlle Bernard: Duprat
 Aimée Iacobescu
 Philippe Lemaire: Colonel Laforet

References

External links 
 
 
 Sept hommes et une garce at Uni France
 Sept hommes et une garce (1966) at Films de France

1967 films
1967 adventure films
French adventure films
1960s French-language films
Films directed by Bernard Borderie
Napoleonic Wars films
Films shot in Romania
Films set in Italy
1960s French films